Francis X. Diebold (born November 12, 1959) is an American economist known for his work in predictive econometric modeling, financial econometrics, and macroeconometrics. He earned both his B.S. and Ph.D. degrees at the University of Pennsylvania, where his doctoral committee included Marc Nerlove, Lawrence Klein, and  Peter Pauly.  He has spent most of his career at Penn, where he has mentored approximately 75 Ph.D. students. Presently he is Paul F. and Warren S. Miller Professor of Social Sciences and Professor of Economics at Penn’s School of Arts and Sciences, and Professor of Finance and Professor of Statistics at Penn’s Wharton School.  He is also a Faculty Research Associate at the National Bureau of Economic Research in Cambridge, Massachusetts, and author of the No Hesitations blog.

Diebold is an elected Fellow of the Econometric Society, the American Statistical Association, and the International Institute of Forecasters, and the recipient of Sloan, Guggenheim, and Humboldt fellowships.  He has served on the editorial boards of Econometrica, Review of Economics and Statistics, and International Economic Review. He has held visiting professorships at Princeton University, University of Chicago, Johns Hopkins University, and New York University.  He was President of the Society for Financial Econometrics (2011-2013) and Chairman of the Federal Reserve System's inaugural Model Validation Council (2012-2013).

Scientific contributions 
In predictive econometric modeling Diebold is best known for the "Diebold-Mariano test" for assessing point forecast accuracy, methods for assessing density forecast conditional calibration, and for his text, Elements of Forecasting.

In financial econometrics Diebold is best known for his contributions to volatility modeling, including the Diebold-Nerlove "latent-factor ARCH model" and the Andersen-Bollerslev-Diebold extraction of "realized volatility" from high-frequency asset returns;

In macroeconometrics Diebold is best known for his work on the macro-finance interface and his work on real-time macroeconomic monitoring, particularly the Aruoba-Diebold-Scotti ("ADS") Business Conditions Index, now maintained by the Federal Reserve Bank of Philadelphia.

Additional noteworthy contributions include the Diebold-Li "dynamic Nelson-Siegel" yield-curve model and its extensions; and the Diebold-Yilmaz framework for dynamic network connectedness measurement and visualization.

References

External links
 No Hesitations Blog
 Personal / Academic Website

Living people
University of Pennsylvania faculty
21st-century American economists
1959 births
Fellows of the American Statistical Association
Fellows of the Econometric Society